Two referendums were held in Switzerland in 1959. The first was held on 1 February on the introduction of women's suffrage at the federal level, but was rejected by 67% of voters. The second was held on 24 May on adding article 22bis to the federal constitution, which concerned civil protection. It was approved by 62% of voters.

Results

February: Women's suffrage

May: Constitutional amendment

See also
 Women's suffrage in Switzerland
 1971 Swiss referendums, when women's suffrage was approved

References

1959 referendums
1959 in Switzerland
Referendums in Switzerland
Women's rights in Switzerland
Women's suffrage in Switzerland
Suffrage referendums
1959 in women's history